Jasper High School (JHS) is a public high school located in Jasper, Indiana, that serves grades 9 through 12 and is one of five in the Greater Jasper Consolidated Schools' district. The principal is Geoff Mauck. The Vice Principal is Dr. Cassidy Nalley. JHS has an enrollment of approximately 1,050 students. The school's colors are black and gold. The school song is set to the tune "Indiana, Our Indiana", and the mascot is the wildcat.

History
Jasper High School was built in 1978 and subsequent remodeling was carried out in 2002. The facilities include 206,000 square feet, built on 50 acres of land. In 2014, the school was once again recognized as an Indiana "four star school". Jasper draws students from the Bainbridge, Madison and Boone townships in Dubois County.

Gym collapse

On May 2, 2011, the main gym collapsed due to a buildup of rainwater on the roof, causing the school to be temporarily closed. The school used the Cabby O'Neill Gymnasium, located near the courthouse on 6th street, Jasper, as a temporary replacement while a new gymnasium was built. This was the first time the Cabby O’Neill had hosted Jasper High School athletic events since 1977. The school rebuilt the gymnasium and an open house and dedication ceremony was held on September 20, 2013. The new gymnasium has a seating capacity of 4,800.

Demographics
The demographic breakdown of the 1,095 students enrolled in 2013-2014 was:
Male - 51.0%
Female - 49.0%
Native American/Alaskan - 0.2%
Asian/Pacific islanders - 0.8%
Black - 0.4%
Hispanic - 7.9%
White - 90.3%
Multiracial - 0.4%

21.0% of the students were eligible for free or reduced lunch.

Athletics

Eight Jasper High School athletic teams have won Indiana High School Athletic Association state championships with the most recent being in 2006. Boys basketball captured the school's first title in 1949, winning the state's iconic single class postseason tournament. The Wildcats nipped Madison, 62-61, at Butler Fieldhouse in Indianapolis.

The baseball team won its first of six state championships, and three in a row, in 1996 after beating Merrillville, 13-6, at Bush Stadium in Indianapolis. The following year, and the final of the single class system, Jasper won another championship after defeating Carmel, 10-8, at Victory Field, home of the Indianapolis Indians, Triple A affiliate of the Pittsburgh Pirates. In 1998, for the third straight year, Jasper's baseball team beat Westfield in the 3A title game, 11-2. 
 
The 4th baseball championship was won in 2000 when the Wildcats routed Plymouth High School, 10-3. Most recently, the 2006 baseball team (34-1) defeated Norwell  13-12.
Since 2006, the Wildcats have returned to Victory Field three times but have come up short in all three games losing to Andrean in 2010 and 2015 and Norwell in 2013.

In 1999, the boys tennis team returned from North Central High School with a state title after knocking off Center Grove by a team score of 3-2. 

In 2001, the football team won its first state championship after beating Delta, 35-20, in the old RCA Dome in Indianapolis.

Notable alumni
 Paul Hoffman (1943) - Basketball player in the NBA and 4 time All-American at Purdue University; League Champion in 1947-48. 
 Shane Lindauer (1992) - Member of the Indiana House of Representatives
 Scott Rolen (1993) - Major League Baseball player, MLB All Star, Gold Glove, World Series Champion; former member of Philadelphia Phillies, St. Louis Cardinals, Toronto Blue Jays and Cincinnati Reds.
 Matt Mauck (1997) - football player: LSU Tigers football starting quarterback; former NFL player with Tennessee Titans and Denver Broncos.
 Mike Braun (1972) - junior United States senator from Indiana

See also
 List of high schools in Indiana

References

External links
 Jasper High School official site
 Greater Jasper Consolidated Schools official website

School buildings completed in 1978
High schools in Southwestern Indiana
Educational institutions established in 1978
Public high schools in Indiana
Big Eight Conference (IHSAA)
Former Southern Indiana Athletic Conference members
Schools in Dubois County, Indiana
Jasper, Indiana
1978 establishments in Indiana